Denis Cyr (born February 4, 1961) is a Canadian former professional ice hockey right winger who played in the National Hockey League for the Calgary Flames, Chicago Black Hawks, and St. Louis Blues. He was also a member of the famous junior line, "Les Trois Denis", while a member of the Montreal Juniors of the Quebec Major Junior Hockey League.

Playing career
As a youth, he played in the 1974 Quebec International Pee-Wee Hockey Tournament with a minor ice hockey team from Verdun, Quebec.

Cyr started his notable hockey career with the Montreal Juniors of the QMJHL. He was promptly put on a line with boyhood friends Denis Savard and Denis Tremblay in a line that was dubbed, "Les Trois Denis". They also shared more than first names, as they were all born on February 4, 1961, and also grew up together in the same Verdun neighbourhood . Savard, the most famous of the three and Hockey Hall of Fame member, asked "What are the odds of that when you think about it. We played together as kids from age eight all the way through until I turned pro." . The line would play two full seasons together from 1977-1979. The line combined for 299 points in its first season, and 366 in its second. Tremblay was traded after 24 games in 1979–80 , however Savard and Cyr both demolished their previous career highs, scoring 181 and 146 points, respectively.

While Tremblay would never be drafted, Cyr and Savard were both drafted in the first round of the 1980 NHL Entry Draft. Savard would be drafted third overall by the Chicago Black Hawks, and Cyr was drafted thirteenth overall by the Calgary Flames. Cyr would play one more season in junior, but he did finish the season playing ten games for the Flames. Cyr wasn't able to continue his scoring prowess with the Flames, and as a result he was traded to the Chicago Black Hawks in 1982 for Carey Wilson. The Hawks were hoping for Cyr to rekindle his chemistry with Denis Savard, who had already established himself as an elite NHLer by this time. However, Cyr still could not secure a permanent NHL position and after a couple of seasons moved on to the St. Louis Blues, and then retired after three seasons in their organization, most of which was spent playing for their minor league affiliate, the Peoria Rivermen of the International Hockey League, winning the Turner Cup in 1985. He would later become the General Manager of the Rivermen, going on to win the Turner Cup again in 1991.

Cyr finished his NHL career with 193 games played, scoring 41 goals and 43 assists for 84 points. He currently does work on behalf of the Chicago Blackhawk Alumni Association.

Personal life
In 2008, Cyr created the Cyr Financial Group in Peoria. He was elected to the Peoria City Council by a single vote in 2017. Cyr was reelected to city council in 2021. 

Cyr currently lives in Peoria, Illinois, with his two daughters. His wife, Jeanie, passed away on October 21, 2021.

Career statistics

Regular season and playoffs

International

References

External links
 

1961 births
Living people
Calgary Flames draft picks
Calgary Flames players
Canadian ice hockey right wingers
Chicago Blackhawks players
Ice hockey people from Montreal
Montreal Juniors players
National Hockey League first-round draft picks
Oklahoma City Stars players
People from Verdun, Quebec
Peoria, Illinois City Council members
Peoria Rivermen (IHL) players
St. Louis Blues players
Springfield Indians players